Al Maton District is a district of the Al Jawf Governorate, Yemen. As of 2003, the district had a population of 28,411 inhabitants.

References

Districts of Al Jawf Governorate